Mohammadabad-e Razzaqzadeh (also Romanized as Moḩammadābād-e Razzāqzādeh and Moḩammadābād Razzāqzādeh; also known as Moḩammadābād) is a village in Shusef Rural District, Shusef District, Nehbandan County, South Khorasan Province, Iran. At the 2006 census, its population was 127, in 44 families.

References 

Populated places in Nehbandan County